The following is a list of Jewish footballers (soccer), organised by nationality.

See also
List of Jews in sports

References

Footballers
Association football player non-biographical articles